Mitsuhide is a masculine Japanese given name.

People with this given name include:
, general of Japan's Warring States period
, Japanese sprint canoer
, Japanese politician with the Liberal Democratic Party
 Mitsuhide Tsuchida (fl. 1980s), Japanese-born Paraguayan football player
Captain New Japan (born Mitsuhide Hirasawa (平澤 光秀), 1982), Japanese professional wrestler

References

Japanese masculine given names